On 16 and 22 July 2015, Gombe, Nigeria, was bombed - apparently by jihadist group Boko Haram.

The Boko Haram insurgency intensified in the mid 2010s, including attacks in the northeastern Nigerian city Gombe in December 2014, January 2015 and February 2015.

On 16 June 2015 in Gombe, a double bombing occurred at a busy marketplace during late afternoon, killing 49 people and injuring 71 others. The first bomb detonated outside a footwear shop and the second outside a china shop opposite it.

On 22 June 2015 in Gombe, at least two bombs exploded at two bus stations, killing at least 29 people.

References

2015 murders in Nigeria